The men's 5000 metres at the 2011 Asian Athletics Championships was held at the Kobe Universiade Memorial Stadium on July 9.

Medalists

Records

Final

References

5000 metres
5000 metres at the Asian Athletics Championships